Sam Sparro is the debut studio album by Australian recording artist Sam Sparro. It was released in the UK on 28 April 2008, after the success of Sparro's debut single, "Black and Gold", which peaked at number two on the UK Singles Chart. The album debuted at number five during its first week of release in the UK, and moved up one spot to number four, its current peak, in its second week of release. In September 2008 the nominees for the 2008 ARIA Awards with the album receiving two nominations including Best Male Artist and Breakthrough Artist – Album.

Singles
"Cottonmouth" was Sparro's first single from the album, released one year before the album, on 10 June 2007.
"Black and Gold" was the second single from the album, meant to act as a lead single for the album's release soon there after. The song went on to become a hit in the U.K., as well as in several other countries worldwide. It entered the UK Singles Chart at #23 and went on to peak at #2 for three non-consecutive weeks. The song also went on the peak at #4 in both Australia and Norway, #5 in Ireland, Europe, and Turkey, and #8 on the US Billboard Dance Charts.
"Too Many Questions" was released in New Zealand, to the country's iTunes store on 21 June 2008. It is unclear if the song was ever supposed to have been an international release or not, but if it was to have been, its release was cancelled.
"21st Century Life" was the third single from the album to be released internationally (fourth single in New Zealand). It was not as successful as "Black and Gold", however, it peaked just outside the top 40 at #42 in Australia, and at #44 in the UK.
"Pocket" was the fourth single (fifth single in New Zealand), as announced in an interview with Popjustice, but its release was halted before it could reach the UK or US. However, it peaked at #33 on the Australian Airplay Chart. "Pocket" was released to iTunes in Australia on 13 December 2008.

Track listing

Notes
 signifies a co-producer

Personnel
Credits adapted from the liner notes of Sam Sparro.

Notes
 signifies person as Sparro's father
 signifies person as Sparro's brother

Chart performance

Weekly charts

Year-end charts

Certifications

Awards and nominations
ARIA Music Awards

|-
| rowspan=2 | 2008 || rowspan=2 | Sam Sparro || Best Male Artist || 
|-
| Breakthrough Artist – Album || 
|-

Release history

References

2008 debut albums
Albums produced by Paul Epworth
Albums produced by Richard X
Island Records albums
Sam Sparro albums